Chempazhanthy is a village in the suburbs of Thiruvananthapuram City, the capital of Kerala state in India, which lies about 7 km north. Chempazhanthy became notable after the birth of Sree Narayana Guru. There was a small hut called "Vayalvaaram" where Sree Narayana Guru was born, in the Malayalam Era year 1032 in the Malayalam month of 'Chingam' under the star 'Chathayam' (August, 1856 AD) .  His father was Maadan (Maadan Aasan). His mother was Kuttiamma. They had four children, one boy (Guru) and three girls.

The S.N. College is the landmark of the area.

History
Chempazhanthy was the hereditary base of the "Chempazhanthy Pillai", who was prominent among the so-called Ettuveetil Pillamar (Pillais from Eight Houses) who rebelled against Travancore King Marthanda Varma, in the novel 'Marthandavarma' by Sri.C.V.Raman Pillai. Also Aniyoor a place in chempazhanthy was where the famous meeting between Sree Narayana Guru and Chattambi Swami took place and they discussed about the social situation of kerala> Recently a "Smruthi Mandapam " was erected at the location as a remembrance of their meeting

References

Villages in Thiruvananthapuram district